The 2003 Boston Marathon was the 107th running of the annual marathon race in Boston, United States and was held on April 21. The elite men's race was won by Kenya's Robert Kipkoech Cheruiyot in a time of 2:10:11 hours and the women's race was won by Russia's Svetlana Zakharova in 2:25:20.

Results

Men

Women

References

Results. Association of Road Racing Statisticians. Retrieved 2020-04-13.

External links
 Boston Athletic Association website

Boston Marathon
Boston
Boston Marathon
Marathon
Boston Marathon